LNK Sporta Parks is a football stadium and multi-sport complex located in Riga, Latvia. The stadium was built in 2022 and currently has 2,300 seats in total. It is the largest privately-owned sports complex in Latvia and its 7th-largest football stadium by capacity. The stadium design incorporates a number of auxiliary facilities, including an additional five football pitches, beach tennis and beach volleyball facilities, among others.

Location
LNK Sporta Parks is located on the outskirts of eastern Riga at 5 Lejupes street, on the left bank of the Daugava river in the area of the Southern Bridge. It is the largest private sports complex in Latvia, and the country's seventh-largest football stadium with a capacity of 2,300 seats.

The sports complex has a total area of 65,000 m2 and encapsulates two natural grass pitches, both with an area of 16,448 m2, four artificial turf pitches with an area of 13,851 m2, a natural grass warmup pitch with an area of 1,350 m2, and, finally, two courts with an area of 678 m2 each, used for beach tennis and beach volleyball.

Use

General activities
LNK Sporta Parks is primarily used for hosting football matches. Since its opening in 2022, it has been the home stadium for the Latvian Higher League club RFS and Latvian Second League club PPK/Betsafe, as well as a number of other teams at different levels of the league system, albeit on an irregular basis.

Additionally, the stadium is used for amateur events in beach tennis and beach volleyball, along with recreational use.

Notable events
On 2 October 2021, FIFA president Gianni Infantino paid a visit to Latvia, which involved meetings with Latvian Prime Minister Arturs Krišjānis Kariņš, Latvian Football Federation president Vadims Ļašenko, Virslīga and FK RFS representatives Māris Verpakovskis and Artemijs Mišins, among others, along with a visit to the LNK Sporta Parks venue.

On 21 September 2022, UEFA president Aleksander Čeferin visited the LNK Sporta Parks during a trip to Latvia, where he met with Ļašenko and FK RFS chairman Artjoms Milovs, discussing the future of sustainable football development in Latvia and the Baltic region.

References

External links
 LNK Sporta Parks on Citify

Sports venues completed in 2022
Buildings and structures in Riga
Football venues in Latvia
2022 establishments in Latvia